Christopher David Chafe, born 1952 in Bern, Switzerland, is a musician, scientist, and the director of the Stanford University Center for Computer Research in Music and Acoustics (CCRMA). He is Duca Family Professor at Stanford University, holding a Doctor of Musical Arts in music composition from Stanford University (1983), a Master of Arts in music composition from University of California, San Diego, and a Bachelor of Arts in music from Antioch College.  He won a Net Challenge Prize from the IEEE and Association for Computing Machinery in 2000, and a National Science Foundation research award in 1999.  He has been performing with the Tintinnabulate ensemble at Rensselaer Polytechnic Institute.

Patents
 US No. 6,801,939 (2004) "Method for Evaluating Quality of Service of a Digital Network Connection"
 US No. 5,508,473 (1996) "Music Synthesizer and Method for Simulating Period Synchronous Noise Associated with Air Flows in Wind Instruments"
 US No. 5,157,216 (1992) "Musical Synthesizer System and Method Using Pulsed Noise for Simulating the Noise Component of Musical Tones"

External links
 https://web.archive.org/web/20070609203534/http://ccrma-www.stanford.edu/~cc/

1952 births
Stanford University Department of Music faculty
Living people
Swiss musicologists